The Donegal county football team represents Donegal in men's Gaelic football and is governed by Donegal GAA, the County Board of the Gaelic Athletic Association. The team competes in the three major annual inter-county competitions; the All-Ireland Senior Football Championship, the Ulster Senior Football Championship and the National Football League.

Donegal was the third Ulster county to win an All-Ireland Senior Football Championship (SFC), following Cavan and Down. The team last won the Ulster Senior Championship in 2019, the All-Ireland Senior Championship in 2012 and the National League in 2007.

This list details the team's achievements in major competitions, and the top scorers for each season. Top scorers in bold were also the top scorers in the All-Ireland Championship that season. Records of competitions such as the Dr Lagan Cup and the Dr McKenna Cup are not (yet) included due to them being considered of less importance than the Ulster/All-Ireland Championship and the National League.

Key

 Pld = Played
 W = Games won
 D = Games drawn
 L = Games lost
 Pts = Points

Seasons

References

 
Seasons Donegal
Donegal